is a village located in Yamabe District, Nara Prefecture, Japan.

As of April 1, 2017, the village has an estimated population of 3,701. The total area is 66.56 km².

Geography 
Located in the northeastern corner of Nara Prefecture, it is located on a plateau, with Mount Kanna as its highest mountain. It is cool in the summer and freezing in the winter. The village has an elevation between 120 m and 620 m. The Nabari River flows through.

Surrounding municipalities 
 Nara Prefecture
 Nara
 Uda
 Mie Prefecture
 Iga
 Nabari

Education 
 Primary Schools
 Yamazoe Elementary School
 Kitano Elementary School
 Junior High Schools
 Yamazoe Junior High School

References

External links 

 Yamazoe village Official Site 

Villages in Nara Prefecture